Seeds Of Heaven is the fifth album of Blue System. Was published in 1991 by BMG Ariola and was produced by Dieter Bohlen. The album contains 10 new tracks.

Track listing

Charts

Weekly charts

Year-end charts

References

External links

Blue System albums
1991 albums
Bertelsmann Music Group albums